The imperial election of 1658 was an imperial election held to select the emperor of the Holy Roman Empire.  It took place in Frankfurt on July 18.

Background  
The death of the previous emperor Ferdinand III, Holy Roman Emperor, on April 2, 1657 was followed by the longest interregnum since the 13th century.  This was largely a result of the youth of Ferdinand's surviving son Leopold I, Holy Roman Emperor, who was only seventeen at the time of his father's death.  It was generally agreed that the emperor had to be at least eighteen years old.  Cardinal Mazarin, the French chief minister, hoped to prevent Leopold's election and to secure either the election of his king Louis XIV of France or, at least, a candidate from outside the House of Habsburg such as Ferdinand Maria, Elector of Bavaria.  The electors called to choose Ferdinand's successor were:

 Johann Philipp von Schönborn, elector of Mainz
 Karl Kaspar von der Leyen, elector of Trier
 Maximilian Henry of Bavaria, elector of Cologne
 Ferdinand Maria, Elector of Bavaria, elector of Bavaria
 John George II, Elector of Saxony, elector of Saxony
 Frederick William, Elector of Brandenburg, elector of Brandenburg
 Charles I Louis, Elector Palatine, elector of the Electoral Palatinate
 Leopold I, Holy Roman Emperor, king of Bohemia

Following the precedent set by his elder brother in the election of 1653, Leopold abstained from the vote.

Elected 
Mazarin's efforts were unsuccessful and Leopold was elected with little difficulty.  He was crowned at Frankfurt on August 1.

References 

1658
1658 in the Holy Roman Empire
Non-partisan elections
17th-century elections in Europe
Leopold I, Holy Roman Emperor